Inyoka is a monotypic genus of southern African snakes. The word "inyoka" means       "snake" in Zulu, Xhosa, Swahili, Shona and other African languages. These snakes were previously grouped in the genus Lamprophis but were found to be closer related to Hormonotus; a substantial genetic divergence between them and a 1900 km gap between their geographic ranges meant a new genus was erected for Lamprophis swazicus, the sole species of the new genus.

Species
Inyoka swazicus is commonly known as the Swazi rock snake or Swaziland house snake. It is found in the eastern South Africa and in Eswatini. It inhabits rocky outcrops in grassland and savanna at altitudes of  asl. Although listed as a "Lower Risk/Near Threatened" species by the International Union for Conservation of Nature (IUCN), it is only considered of "Least Concern" in the South African Conservation Assessment of Reptiles in view of its relatively wide distribution and low level of anthropogenic disturbance in its habitat.

The head is small, dorso-ventrally flattened, and broader than neck and distinct from it. Eyes are large, protruding, and with vertically elliptical pupil. They are non-venomous.

References

Lamprophiidae
Monotypic snake genera
Reptiles of South Africa
Reptiles of Eswatini
Reptiles described in 1970
Taxa named by William Roy Branch